Something to Remember is a compilation album by American singer Madonna, released by Maverick Records on November 3, 1995. The album was conceived after a highly controversial period in Madonna's career, during which many critics speculated that her career was in decline. The compilation of ballads presented a softer image for the singer and span over a decade, including a reworked version of "Love Don't Live Here Anymore" as well as three new songs: "You'll See", "One More Chance" and a cover of Marvin Gaye's "I Want You". The singles "I'll Remember" and "This Used to Be My Playground", were also included, marking the first time these songs were featured on a Madonna album.

For producing the new songs for the album, Madonna worked with David Foster and Nellee Hooper. She stated that the concept for the album was to make fans and critics alike remember her musical talent rather than her media controversies. Something to Remember was well received by music critics who were impressed with Madonna's vocals and the album's cohesiveness. It was also a commercial success, topping charts in Australia, Austria, Finland, Italy, and Singapore, and peaking within top ten elsewhere. In the United States, it reached number six on the Billboard 200 and was certified triple platinum by the Recording Industry Association of America (RIAA) for shipments of three million units. Worldwide, Something to Remember has sold over ten million copies.

Four singles and one promotional single were released to promote the album. Originally intended as the album's lead single, "I Want You" was released as the promotional single preceding the album, with a music video directed by Earle Sebastian. "You'll See" was released as the album's first single on October 23, 1995, accompanied by a Spanish version titled "Verás" and a music video directed by Michael Haussman. The song peaked at number six on the Billboard Hot 100, while reaching the top five in Austria, Canada, Finland, Italy and the United Kingdom. "Oh Father", "One More Chance" and "Love Don't Live Here Anymore" were released as the follow up singles, but gained little commercial response; the latter received a music video directed by Jean-Baptiste Mondino.

Background 

After a controversy-fueled period, Madonna's personal life had started to dominate over her musical career. "She knew it was time to make a change" as said by a member of her management team who claimed that she wanted to prove there was more to her than the constant media circus surrounding her. J. Randy Taraborrelli, author of Madonna: An Intimate Biography, documented that Madonna had previously stated that many of her songs have been overlooked in response to current trends. In August 1995, it was confirmed that Madonna had been working on a compilation album of full ballads, tentatively titled I Want You, which would be released around Christmas season. According to Taraborrelli, whether Madonna wanted to release such an album because "she had a point to prove or simply to keep a contractual obligation, [the album] did make a statement." Described as a "love letter from Madonna to her fans and music lovers alike" the compilation seemed to notify her contemporaries of her musical talent. On the album's liner note, Madonna further explained:
So much controversy has swirled around my career this past decade that very little attention ever gets paid to my music. The songs are all but forgotten. While I have no regrets regarding the choices I've made artistically, I've learned to appreciate the idea of doing things in a simpler way. So without a lot of fanfare, without any distractions, I present to you this collection of ballads. Some are old, some are new. All of them are from my heart.

The new material for the album saw her collaboration with a well-known producer David Foster, who had worked with the likes of Barbra Streisand, Al Jarreau and Earth, Wind & Fire. Foster recalled the first time Madonna's publicist Liz Rosenberg contacted him for a dinner with the singer: "When Madonna first called, I was a little surprised - my music isn't really hip enough for her - but I guess her camp thought we should meet, and I got a call from Liz Rosenberg, the PR maven who has been with Madonna from the beginning." Not long after the dinner, Madonna and Foster began the recording session in his Malibu studio. During the album conception, Madonna was also asked by her Bedtime Stories producer Nellee Hooper to collaborate with British trip hop group Massive Attack for a Marvin Gaye tribute album. Previously, the band had offered the collaboration to several artists, including Chaka Khan who rejected it. Madonna and Massive Attack covered Gaye's 1976 hit "I Want You", which finished among the new material for Something to Remember and was also included on the Inner City Blues: The Music of Marvin Gaye released by Motown Records.

Development 

The first track selected for use on the compilation album was "Love Don't Live Here Anymore" from Like a Virgin (1984). The track was reworked by producer David Reitzas and features a different composition from the 1984 version. Madonna also included two soundtrack singles which had never been featured on any of her own albums, "This Used to Be My Playground" from the 1992 film A League of Their Own and "I'll Remember" from the 1994 film With Honors. Other previously released material selected for the compilation were "Crazy for You" from Vision Quest (1985), "Live to Tell" from True Blue (1986), "Oh Father" from Like a Prayer (1989), "Something to Remember" from I'm Breathless (1990), "Rain" from Erotica (1992), as well as "Take a Bow" and "Forbidden Love", both from Bedtime Stories (1994). Two tracks on the compilation, "Crazy for You" and "Live to Tell", were overlapping with her first greatest hits album, The Immaculate Collection (1990). According to Rikky Rooksby, the author of The Complete Guide to the Music of Madonna, the song selection creates a soft atmosphere, the music is downbeat and "emotionally introverted" with mellow vibes throughout.

Madonna's recording session with David Foster resulted in contributing two new songs to the final track listing, "You'll See" and "One More Chance". Foster commented: "At the end of the day, the songs we did were not particularly impressive, though one of them, "You'll See", was really neat. Madonna had written a great lyric (You think that I can't live without your love / You'll see) and I thought my music was great." "You'll See" is a low bass track featuring wind chimes and a Spanish guitar. Throughout the chord changes progression to give Madonna's vocals dominance in the song, and after a minute the percussion starts with a tremolo guitar added later. Lyrically, the song talks of independence after the end of a love affair stating that Madonna will go onto greater things. Madonna was asked whether the track was about revenge to which she replied "No, it's about empowering yourself." Madonna later recorded the Spanish version of "You'll See" in Gloria and Emilio Estefan's studio in Miami. Titled "Verás", the song was adapted into Spanish by Paz Martinez. The next original song, "One More Chance", is an acoustic ballad, whose lyrics are about attempting to win a lost lover back. The song was inspired by Madonna's real life experience, but she wrote it from the opposite point of view. Its composition has an organic arrangement, devoid of any synths and sequencing, and only based on guitars with plenty of chord changes and subdued strings.

Nellee Hooper produced another new addition to the compilation, the cover version of Marvin Gaye's "I Want You". After Madonna accepted Hooper's suggestion to collaborate with Massive Attack, the band sent Madonna the music of the song first. Robert "3D" Del Naja, one of the band members, subsequently went to New York with Hooper and worked in the studio for two days. Del Naja said, "I think the really cool thing about it was the fact that [Madonna] sang it so beautifully. There was no special effects, no messing around—it was just in there singing it with a lot of passion and soul." The opening track of the compilation, "I Want You" starts with a long introduction featuring a hip-hop drum beat with emphasis on the bass section of the instrumental alongside a semi-tonal string figure. The second verse features a harp and a repeating drum loop accompanied with a telephone style bleeping sound. Madonna's vocals at times are accompanied by spoken passages with her overall vocals dominating the track, with lyrics discussing a man that no longer wants her, while she is determined to change his mind. The compilation closes with the orchestral version of "I Want You" in which the original drum track, bass and percussion are removed. The version starts slower with Madonna's vocals entering with a low string bass line only, gradually more string arrangements are added with harp and brass featured in the background of the mix. A moment towards the end of the track hears her voice with no accompaniment creating a "dramatic" theme, and overall the version features around 20 seconds less than the original.

Artwork and release 

The artwork was taken from a July 1995 photoshoot with Peruvian photographer Mario Testino in Milan, Italy. Madonna modelled Versace clothes for their upcoming Fall/Winter 1995 campaign. Other pictures from the shoot would appear in magazines, such as Vanity Fair, NME and Vogue Italia. The packaging included with the release showed Madonna looking "deliciously cosmopolitan" as she wore a tight-fit white cocktail attire, while the back cover artwork is predominantly more playful. The front cover artwork presented Madonna leaning against a wall with an expression of "romantic loss or absorption." Designed as the Madonna album which would appeal to a larger audience in contrast to her previous records, Bedtime Stories and  Erotica, the booklet featured red roses inside and a golden yellow flower on the back cover. According to The Guardian writer Caroline Sullivan who believed that Madonna removed her nose ring for the cover shot indicated she "wants the album to be taken on its own merits." In 2013, the artwork was dubbed as one of the "20 Most Fashionable Album Covers Ever" by the Dutch edition of Elle magazine. The title of the album derives from her 1990 song of the same name since it had received little attention during the release of its original album, I'm Breathless.

Something to Remember was released in some European countries on November 3, 1995. In Madonna's native country, the album was released on November 7, 1995. In Japan, the album was released under the title Best of Madonna: Ballad Collection on November 10, 1995, containing her 1986 song "La Isla Bonita" as a bonus track. "La Isla Bonita" was re-released three months prior the compilation as a double A-side record with "Human Nature", the final single from Bedtime Stories. Receiving gold certification from the Recording Industry Association of Japan (RIAJ), the song was added to Something to Remember track listing in the hope of boosting the album sales in the region. In Latin America, the album included the bonus track "Verás", the Spanish version of "You'll See". In 2001, WEA Records released a box set of Something to Remember and The Immaculate Collection to coincide with the release of Madonna's second greatest hits package, GHV2.

Singles 
"I Want You" was released as a promotional single from the album on October 2, 1995. It was originally intended as the album's first single, but cancelled due to contract problems between Madonna's label and Motown Records, the copyright owner of the song. The music video for the song was directed by Earle Sebastian and was nominated for the MTV Amour category at the MTV Europe Music Awards 1996. 

"You'll See" was released as the album's lead single on October 30, 1995. The song reached the top five position in Austria, Canada, Finland, Italy and the United Kingdom. The single managed to peak at number six on the Billboard Hot 100, making Madonna the third act in history (after Aretha Franklin and Marvin Gaye) to have a hit peak at each position from one to ten on the chart. An accompanying music video was directed by Michael Haussman as a sequel to Madonna's previous music video for "Take a Bow".

"Oh Father" was released as the second single for European market on December 21, 1995. It became a top ten hit in Finland and achieved top 20 placement in the United Kingdom, but charted weakly in the rest of the continent, resulting a low peak of number 62 on the European Hot 100 Singles chart. 

"One More Chance" received a limited single release in Australia and several European countries on March 7, 1996. The song peaked inside the top 40 in Australia, Finland, Sweden and the United Kingdom.

"Love Don't Live Here Anymore" was released as the final single from the album on March 19, 1996. The song received poor commercial reception, peaking at number 78 on the Billboard Hot 100, while reaching the top forty in Australia and Canada. Its accompanying music video was directed in by Jean-Baptiste Mondino at the Confitería El Molino in Buenos Aires, Argentina, during Madonna's day off from filming Evita. It was shot in a single frame portraying Madonna in an empty suite of an abandoned hotel.

Critical reception 

Something to Remember was met with critical acclaim. Stephen Thomas Erlewine from AllMusic wrote that "Throughout the album, Madonna proves that she's a terrific singer whose voice has improved over the years." He added, "Not one of the tracks is second-rate, and the best songs on Something to Remember rank among the best pop music of the '80s and '90s". Neil Strauss of The New York Times felt all the songs on the album "cohere better than a greatest-hits package would" and "they tell a story of their own, of a voice and attitude that have hardened in the dozen years that have elapsed between the bubble-gum-chomping innocence of 1983's 'Crazy for You' and the tortured torch singing of the new 'You'll See'." Ken Tucker of Entertainment Weekly commented: "By placing her greatest-hit ballads ('Live to Tell', 'Crazy for You', 'Take a Bow', etc.) in a new context—that is, separated from her more attention-getting dance music—Madonna reinvigorates them, which is just what a good best-of compilation is supposed to do. The three new songs 'You'll See', 'One More Chance', and a wonderfully eerie version of Marvin Gaye's 'I Want You' are consumer enticements that just add to the allure." Writing for About.com, Bill Lamb called it "another outstanding greatest hits collection" from Madonna's discography.

According to Greg Forman from The Post and Courier, the album shows that "There's an important difference between having a great voice and being a great singer. Whitney Houston or Mariah Carey can sing circles (and octaves) around the most famous woman on the planet, but Madonna, through sheer force of personality sells her slow numbers with a panache few modern singers can match." John Wirt from The Advocate said that the album shows that Madonna "can craft slow songs as effectively as she knocks out dance numbers" and found "an unaffected simplicity and sincerity" in her ballad singing. Writing for The Baltimore Sun, J. D. Considine believed that with the album "Madonna not only reminds us that there's more to her music than dance tunes, but also demonstrates that her voice is nowhere near as thin and chirpy as her detractors imagine." He further explained, "one of the most amazing things about the album is how sultry and assured she sounds ... The Madonna on display here not only has a richer, deeper voice than you imagined, but more interpretive insight as well."

Alwyn W. Turner in the book The Rough Guide to Rock stated that the album features "the best of her slow pieces" displaying that "Madonna had evolved over the years into an excellent ballad singer." Edna Gundersen from USA Today said that the album "flaunts the less sizzling, though equally galvanizing, highlights of her career." She was mostly impressed with Madonna's vocal and emotional power on the track "You'll See" which became "the clearest proof that the ambitious blonde is more singer than celebrity." J. Randy Taraborrelli in his book Madonna: An Intimate Biography picked the David Foster produced tracks as standouts, saying "It was interesting that, with all of his [David Foster] exciting musical ability from which to draw, he and Madonna would come up with two of the most sombre songs she has ever recorded—but such is the excitement of collaboration; one never knows what will come of it." Tirzah Agassi from The Jerusalem Post said the arrangements on the new songs "show a great leap in sophistication" and felt that Madonna "has invested much in improving her vocal technique." The Village Voice critic Robert Christgau dismissed the album with a "dud" rating, which indicates "a bad record whose details rarely merit further thought".

Commercial performance 

In the United States, Something to Remember debuted and peaked at number six on the Billboard 200 chart on the issue date of November 25, 1995, with 113,000 copies. It stayed on the chart for 34 weeks and was certified triple platinum by the Recording Industry Association of America (RIAA) for shipments of three million units. According to Nielsen SoundScan, the album has sold 2,102,000 copies as of December 2016. This figure does not include sales from clubs, such as BMG Music Club where the album sold an additional 179,000 copies. In Canada, the album entered the RPM Albums Chart at number two on November 20, 1995. The album held the top ten position for eight consecutive weeks before descending to number 12 on January 29, 1996. It stayed on the chart for 26 weeks, and was certified double platinum by the Music Canada (MC) for shipments of 200,000 copies.

In the United Kingdom, Something to Remember debuted at number three on the UK Albums Chart on November 18, 1995. It dropped to number four in its second and third week, spending twelve consecutive weeks in the top ten before falling to number 11 on February 2, 1996. The album was certified triple platinum by the British Phonographic Industry (BPI) for shipments of 900,000 copies. In Germany, the album reached number two on the Media Control Charts for two weeks and was certified platinum by the Bundesverband Musikindustrie (BVMI) for shipping 500,000 copies. The album also reached the top ten of the charts in other European countries and peaked at number one in Austria, Finland and Italy, where it shipped more than 500,000 copies according to the Federazione Industria Musicale Italiana (FIMI). Its commercial success in the continent allowed the album to peak at number three on the European Top 100 Albums chart. It was certified triple platinum by the International Federation of the Phonographic Industry (IFPI) for selling over three million copies across Europe.

The album was also well received commercially in Asia-Pacific territories. In Japan, the album peaked at number nine on the Oricon Albums Chart and was certified double platinum by the Recording Industry Association of Japan (RIAJ) for shipping 400,000 copies. In Australia, the album debuted at number two on November 19, 1995, and topped the record chart the following week. It stayed on the top 50 for 19 weeks and received quadruple platinum award from the Australian Recording Industry Association (ARIA) for shipments of 280,000 copies. It also became a top-ten album in New Zealand, peaking at number eight, and was certified platinum by the Recorded Music NZ (RMNZ) for shipments of 15,000 copies. Overall, the album has sold more than ten million copies worldwide.

Impact 
According to Billboard, Something to Remember was a leading and precursor example in the trend of releasing compilations of ballads. Its influence was clear in afterward albums such as If We Fall in Love Tonight by Rod Stewart. Writing for Metro Silicon Valley, critic Gina Arnold deemed the release as a "triumph", labeling it as a "rare collection that has both a theme—ballads—and a measure of inspiration". She further praised her cohesive manage of compilation releases up that point, saying Madonna "is not the artist who will simply slap a bunch of hits together". Author Mark Bego also praised its thematic, saying "is a beautiful album, graced with a strong unifying feeling in the ballad realm".

Timothy White from Billboard ranked Something to Remember as the fifth best album of 1995. In a poll conducted by Jornal do Brasil, it ended as the best foreign album of 1996 and Madonna as the best female foreign artist. American magazine Hits included the compilation in their 1996 list of the "Top 50 Albums of the Year". By February 1996, Something to Remember was the third best-selling folio from Warner Bros. Publications.

Track listing

Personnel 
Credits adapted from the album's liner notes.

Madonna – producer, arranger, vocals
Dean Chamberlain – photography
Felipe Elgueta – assistant, assistant engineer, mixing assistant
David Foster – producer, arranger, keyboard
Simon Franglen – programming, synclavier
Nellee Hooper – producer
Suzie Katayama – cello
Massive Attack – guest artist
Rob Mounsey – arranger
Jan Mullaney – keyboards
Dean Parks – acoustic guitar
Dave Reitzas – remix producer, engineer, mixing
Ronnie Rivera – assistant, assistant engineer, mixing assistant
Greg Ross – art direction, design
Mario Testino – photography
Michael Thompson – electric guitar
Michael Hart Thompson – electric guitar

Charts

Weekly charts

Year-end charts

Certifications and sales

Release history

See also 
List of best-selling albums by women
List of number-one albums in Australia during the 1990s
List of Top 25 albums for 1995 in Australia
List of number-one hits of 1995 (Italy)
List of number-one hits of 1996 (Italy)

Notes

References

External links 
 
 

1995 greatest hits albums
Albums produced by Nellee Hooper
Albums produced by David Foster
Albums produced by Madonna
Madonna compilation albums
Maverick Records compilation albums
Warner Records compilation albums